The Freixo Bridge which was inaugurated in 1995 is a Portuguese bridge over the Douro river, connecting Vila Nova de Gaia and Porto. The purpose of its construction was to create an alternative to Arrábida and D. Luis I bridges. The designers of the bridge are António Reis and Daniel de Sousa. The bridge with total length of 705 m has 8 spans.

Gallery

References

External links

Bridges in Porto
Bridges over the Douro River